The following is a list of the Syria national football team's competitive records and statistics. Their first international match was played on 19 April 1942 in Beirut against Lebanon, winning 2–1. The team they have played the most is Jordan, with a total of 40 matches played.

Individual records

Player records 

Players in bold are still active with Syria.

Most capped players

Top goalscorers

Age records 
 Oldest player to make debut: Firas Al-Khatib, aged 36 years and 94 days vs , 5 September 2019
 Youngest player to make debut: Abdelrazaq Al-Hussain, aged 17 years and 82 days vs , 07 Dec 2002
 Oldest player to score: Firas Al-Khatib, aged 36 years and 94 days vs , 5 September 2019

Manager records

Team records

Wins
 Largest win 
 13–0 vs  Muscat and Oman on 6 September 1965
 12–0 vs  on 4 June 1997
 12–0 vs  on 30 April 2001
 Largest home win 
 13–0 vs  Muscat and Oman on 6 September 1965
 Largest away win 
 12–0 vs  on 4 June 1997
 Largest win at the Asian Cup 
 2–1 vs  on 9 January 2011
 2–1 vs  on 12 December 1996

Draws
 Highest scoring draw 
 3–3 vs  on 17 October 1998 
 3–3 vs  on 18 May 2001
 Highest scoring draw at the Asian Cup 
 1–1 vs  on 1 December 1984

Defeats
 Largest defeat 
 8–0 vs  on 25 November 1949
 8–0 vs  on 16 October 1951
 7–0 vs  on 20 November 1949
 Largest defeat at home  
 1–7 vs  on 21 June 2004
 Largest defeat away  
 8–0 vs  on 25 November 1949
 8–0 vs  on 16 October 1951
 Largest defeat at the Asian Cup 
 3–0 vs  on 9 December 1996
 3–0 vs  on 4 December 1988

Attendance
Highest home attendance 
 50,000, vs , 30 March 1989

Highest away attendance 
 100,000, vs , 13 June 1997

World rankings

FIFA
Source: FIFA.com

 Highest FIFA ranking  68th (July 2018)
 Lowest FIFA ranking  152nd (September 2014, March 2015)

Elo
Source: Eloratings.net
 Highest Elo ranking  53rd (October 1974)
 Lowest Elo ranking  125th (September 1984)

Goal records

General
 First goal  Mudhafar Al-Aqqad vs  on 1 August 1953

 Most goals  Firas Al-Khatib (2001–2019), 36 goals

. Highlighted names denote a player still playing or available for selection.

Hat-tricks

In major tournaments

AFC Asian Cup

 Most goals in a single Asian Cup tournament  Jamal Keshek (in 1980), 2 goalsNader Joukhadar (in 1996), 2 goals Abdelrazaq Al-Hussain (in 2011), 2 goals
 Most goals in total at Asian Cup tournaments  Walid Abu Al-Sel (in 1984, 1988), 2 goalsJamal Keshek (in 1980), 2 goalsNader Joukhadar (in 1996), 2 goals Abdelrazaq Al-Hussain (in 2011), 2 goals
 Most goals in a single Asian Cup finals match  A. Al-Hussain, 2 goals vs  on 9 January 2011
 First goal in an Asian Cup finals match Jamal Keshek, vs  on 19 September 1980

Competition records

FIFA World Cup

*Denotes draws include knockout matches decided via penalty shoot-out.

AFC Asian Cup

*Denotes draws include knockout matches decided via penalty shoot-out.
<div style="text-align:left">

Olympic Games

*Denotes draws include knockout matches decided via penalty shoot-out.

WAFF Championship

*Denotes draws include knockout matches decided via penalty shoot-out.

FIFA Arab Cup 

*Denotes draws include knockout matches decided via penalty shoot-out.

Pan Arab Games 

*Denotes draws include knockout matches decided via penalty shoot-out.

Mediterranean Games

Asian Games

*Denotes draws include knockout matches decided via penalty shoot-out.

West Asian Games 

*Denotes draws include knockout matches decided via penalty shoot-out.

Head-to-head record 
The list shown below shows the Syria national football team all-time international record against opposing nations.
 after match against  Key

(a) Denotes defunct national football team.

(b) Including North Yemen.

Unofficial matches
This is a list of the Syria national football team results from 1939 to the present day that, for various reasons, are not'' accorded the status of official International A Matches.

1930s

1940s

1950s

1960s

2020s

References

External links
 FIFA.com
 Syria - List of International Matches, RSSSF, 1 Jan 2005
 World Football Elo Ratings: Syria

National association football team records and statistics
Records